Remembrances is an album by David Murray recorded in 1990 and released on the Japanese DIW label in 1991. It features performances by Murray with Hugh Ragin, Dave Burrell, Wilber Morris and Tani Tabbal.

Reception
The Allmusic review awarded the album 3 stars.

Track listing
All compositions by David Murray except as indicated
 "Lo-Chi-Lo" - 7:28 
 "I Want to See You Everyday of Your Life" (Dave Burrell, Monica Larsson) - 4:23 
 "Dartman" - 8:12 
 "Sometimes I Feel Like a Motherless Child" (Traditional) - :10 
 "Popolo Paniolo" (Burrell, Larsson) - 7:29 
 "Dextor's Dues" - 7:41 
 "Remembrances" - 5:12

Personnel
David Murray - tenor saxophone
Hugh Ragin - trumpet
Dave Burrell - piano
Wilber Morris - bass
Tani Tabbal - drums

Reception 

1991 albums
David Murray (saxophonist) albums
DIW Records albums